Two ships of the Royal Navy have been named HMS Delphinium:

  was an  launched in 1915 and sold in 1933
 

Royal Navy ship names